Saharsa was a Lok Sabha constituency in Bihar.

Members of Parliament

1952: Lalit Narayan Mishra, Indian National Congress
1957: Lalit Narayan Mishra, Indian National Congress
1962: Bhupendra Narayan Mandal, Praja Socialist Party
1964: Lahtan Choudhary, Indian National Congress
1967: Gunanand Thakur, Samyukta Socialist Party
1971: Chiranjib Jha, Indian National Congress
1977: Vinayak Prasad Yadav, Janata Party
1980: Kamal Nath Jha, Indian National Congress
1984: Chandra Kishore Pathak, Indian National Congress
1989: Sury Narayan Yadav, Janata Dal
1991: Sury Narayan Yadav, Janata Dal
1996: Dinesh Chandra Yadav, Janata Dal
1998: Anup Lal Yadav, Rashtriya Janata Dal
1999: Dinesh Chandra Yadav, Janata Dal (United)
2004: Ranjeet Ranjan, Lok Janshakti Party
2008 onwards: see Supaul (Lok Sabha constituency)

References

See also
 Saharsa
 List of Constituencies of the Lok Sabha

Politics of Saharsa district
Former Lok Sabha constituencies of Bihar
Former constituencies of the Lok Sabha
2008 disestablishments in India
Constituencies disestablished in 2008